Howard Wellington Bramhall Sr. (November 18, 1895 – July 7, 1962) was an American judge who served as a justice of the Delaware Supreme Court from 1954 to 1962 and as Vice Chancellor of the State from 1951 to 1954.

Biography
Bramhall was born on November 18, 1895, in Georgetown, Delaware, and attended high school there. He received a bachelor's degree from University of Delaware in 1916, and a law degree from Temple University in 1920. Temple gave him an honorary degree of doctor laws in 1955. He practiced law near Philadelphia for about a decade after graduating from Temple, before joining the Delaware State Bar Association in 1930. He was the second-longest serving on the Sussex County bar. He also served on the State Board of Education, was director of the First National Bank of Dagsboro, and was president of the Sussex Finance Company.

In 1951, Bramhall was appointed by Elbert N. Carvel as vice chancellor on the Delaware Court of Chancery. He was unanimously confirmed by the state senate to a 12-year term. He served in that position until August 1954, when he was nominated by J. Caleb Boggs to serve on the Delaware Supreme Court as a justice, following the resignation of James M. Tunnell Jr. He was confirmed by the senate on August 30. He served on the court until his death in July 1962, following a battle with cancer.

References

1895 births
1962 deaths
People from Georgetown, Delaware
University of Delaware alumni
Temple University alumni
Delaware Republicans
Justices of the Delaware Supreme Court